Mary Beth Walsh is the Assembly member for the 112th District of the New York State Assembly. She is a Republican. The district includes portions of Saratoga County, including Ballston Spa, Country Knolls, Galway and Milton as well as portions of Schenectady County including East Glenville and Scotia.

Life and career
A practicing attorney, Walsh formerly served on the Ballston Town Council, and also served as Saratoga Assistant County Attorney and the Town of Edinburg Attorney. She has also served on various other board and commissions throughout her career.

New York State Assembly
In 2016, longtime Assemblyman Jim Tedisco, who had represented the district for thirty four years, decided to run for the New York Senate to replace Hugh Farley, who had served in his seat for forty years.  Walsh, seeking the Republican nomination, defeated Jim Fischer in the primary election, 55% to 45%.

She would go on to win the general election against Democrat Michael R. Godlewski by a 62% to 38% margin. Walsh was sworn into office on January 1, 2017.

References

External links
New York State Assemblywoman Mary Beth Walsh official site

Living people
Republican Party members of the New York State Assembly
21st-century American politicians
21st-century American women politicians
Women state legislators in New York (state)
Year of birth missing (living people)